The Socialist Party of Ohio (SPOH) is a socialist political party in the U.S. state of Ohio. Founded in 1901, the SPO was an affiliate of the Socialist Party of America. Since the 1972 renaming of the SPA to Social Democrats, USA, it has been the state chapter of the Socialist Party USA (SPUSA).

Socialist Party of America
The Socialist Party of Ohio was founded in 1901 and inherited a tradition of independent labor political organization. It grew modestly from its establishment until the Panic of 1907 and then again during the years immediately before World War I.

2010 campaign for the U.S. Senate
The Socialist Party of Ohio qualified for ballot access in the United States Senate election in Ohio, 2010. SPOH candidate Dan La Botz received 25 368 votes (0.68%); the Republican winner Rob Portman received 2.125 million votes (57.25%) and  the Democratic candidate Lee Fisher received 1.448 million votes (39.00%).

References

Ohio
Ohio
Political parties in Ohio
State and local socialist parties in the United States